Milada Emmerová (born 4 November 1944) is a Czech doctor, politician and former Minister of Health for the Czech Republic. She is a member of the Czech Social Democratic Party (ČSSD). Currently she is senator of Senate of the Parliament of the Czech Republic.

Personal life
Born in Plzeň, Emmerová was married (1966–1982) to Jiří Emmer, and had two children Jiří Emmer (born 1967), who became a doctor, and Helena Emmerová (born 1979). She later divorced Jiří Emmer.

Medical career
Emmerová completed her medical degree at Charles University in 1967. She practiced internal medicine in Pilsen rising to the rank of supervising physician in 1978. In the 1990s she became a consultant and lectured throughout the country. Since 2000 she has been a member of the New York Academy of Sciences. As of 2006 she remained on the faculty of the teaching hospital in Pilsen. In June 2006 she was appointed to the board of the Czech Universal Health Insurance Company (VZP).

Political career
Originally a member of the Communist Party of Czechoslovakia (KSČ), she joined the Czech Social Democratic Party (ČSSD) in 1994. Elected in the Czech election of 1996  and 1998 to the Chamber of Deputies, she served on the Health committee, first as a member and then starting after her reelection in 2002, as chairwoman. In 2004 in the government of Stanislav Gross, she was appointed as Minister of Health, succeeding Jozef Kubinyi. When Gross resigned, she was reappointed by Jiří Paroubek. In a 2004 by-election she ran for the Senate from Plzeň, but lost to the ODS candidate. During her tenure as Minister of Health she created hospital ombudsmen to expedite the handling of patient complaints.  However, during her tenure health care costs continued to rise dramatically. She was removed as Minister of Health on 12 August 2005.

In 2008 she was elected to the regional assembly for the Pilsen area (Zastupitelstvo Plzeňského kraje) and later as governor of that region. In the 2010 by-elections for parliament, she was elected to the Chamber of Deputies and resigned as governor. She served from 29 May 2010 to the end of the term on 20 October 2012. In 2012 she again ran for the Senate as a ČSSD candidate and was elected for a six-year term. She is the vice-chair of the Senate's Committee on Health and Social Policy.

References

1944 births
Living people
Health ministers of the Czech Republic
Czech Social Democratic Party MPs
Czech Social Democratic Party Senators
Czech physicians
Czech women physicians
Politicians from Plzeň
Communist Party of Czechoslovakia politicians
Women government ministers of the Czech Republic
Czech Social Democratic Party governors
21st-century Czech women politicians
20th-century Czech women politicians
Czechoslovak physicians
Members of the Chamber of Deputies of the Czech Republic (1996–1998)
Members of the Chamber of Deputies of the Czech Republic (1998–2002)
Members of the Chamber of Deputies of the Czech Republic (2002–2006)
Members of the Chamber of Deputies of the Czech Republic (2010–2013)
Charles University alumni